Shea Connors is an American soccer player who plays in both Iceland and Australia. She grew up in New Haven, Connecticut, and went to college in St. John's University. When at University she was selected for the All-Big East Team.

In 2018 Connors signed to play for Knattspyrnufélag Reykjavíkur in Iceland's top division.

She then moved to Queensland, Australia to play in the National Premier League with the Logan Lightning where she scored 25 goals in 15 matches which consisted of 5 hat-tricks including a 6-goal haul. Following these performances she was recruited to the Brisbane Roar for the end of the 2019–20 W-League to help with their unsuccessful push for the finals. In March 2020, Connors left Brisbane Roar and returned to Logan Lightning. In August 2021, after scoring 78 goals in the NPLW, Connors left Lions FC and re-joined Brisbane Roar .

References

External links
 

American women's soccer players
Living people
St. John's Red Storm women's soccer players
Brisbane Roar FC (A-League Women) players
A-League Women players
1996 births
Women's association football forwards
American expatriate women's soccer players
Expatriate women's soccer players in Australia
American expatriate sportspeople in Australia
Expatriate women's footballers in Iceland
American expatriate sportspeople in Iceland
KR women's football players
Queensland Lions FC players